Çimenli may refer to several places in Turkey:

 Çimenli, Artvin
 Çimenli, Hopa
 Çimenli, Murgul
 Çimenli, Narman

See also
 Çəmənli (disambiguation)